Christoph Reuter (born 28 November 1968) is a German University professor for systematic musicology at the University of Vienna.

life 
Born in Duisburg, Reuter studied musicology at the University of Cologne, received his doctorate summa cum laude in 1996 and his habilitation in 2002. He has held guest professorships or teaching positions at several universities (University of Vienna, Hochschule für Musik Franz Liszt, Weimar), and has also been a managing partner of a Cologne-based internet agency since 2000. Since 2008, Reuter has been university professor for systematic musicology at the University of Vienna.

Scientific activity 
His research interests include musical acoustics, music physiology and psychological aspects of music perception as well as music-related internet/software projects. Examples of his manifold studies in the field of systematic musicology are investigations on sound colour perception, on the Variophon, on music automatons, on perception of unpleasant noises and on musical dice games..

Memberships 
He is also a member of the European Society for the Cognitive Sciences of Music (ESCOM), the Consulting Boards of Musicae Scientiae, the Österreichischen Gesellschaft für Musikwissenschaft (ÖGMW), the Gesellschaft für Musikforschung (GfM), the Deutschen Gesellschaft für Akustik (Dega), the Internationalen Arbeitskreis für systematische Musikwissenschaft (IASM) as well as the Gesellschaft für selbstspielende Musikinstrumente (GSM)

Publications 
 Der Einschwingvorgang nichtperkussiver Musikinstrumente. Lang, Frankfurt 1995
 Die auditive Diskrimination von Orchesterinstrumenten. Diss. Lang, Frankfurt 1996
 Klangfarbe und Instrumentation. Habil. Lang, Frankfurt 2002
 together with Wolfgang Auhagen: Kompendium Musikalische Akustik. (Kompendien Musik 16), Laaber, Laaber 2013
 Reuter, Christoph, Enders, Bernd; Jacobi, Rolf: Lexikon Musikautomaten. (Encyclopedia of Mechanical Musical Instruments)(German/English), CD-ROM, Schott, Mainz 2000.
 Reuter, C., Czedik-Eysenberg, I., Siddiq, S., & Oehler, M. (2018) Formant Distances and the Similarity Perception of Wind Instrument Timbres. In: R. Parncutt, & S. Sattmann (Eds.): Proceedings of ICMPC15/ESCOM10 (p. 367-371). Graz: University of Graz.
 Reuter, Christoph; Siddiq, Saleh: The colourful life of timbre spaces - Timbre concepts from early ideas to meta-timbre space and beyond. In: Clemens Wöllner, Clemens (Ed.): Body, Sound and Space in Music and Beyond Multimodal Explorations. Sempre Studies in the Psychology of Music. Routledge, London/New York 2017, p. 150-167.
 Reuter, C. (2018). Commentary on "An Exploratory Study of Western Orchestration: Patterns through History" by S.H. Chon, D. Huron, & D. DeVlieger. Empirical Musicology Review 12(3-4), 160-171. doi: dx.doi.org/10.18061/emr.v12i3-4.5992
 Reuter, Christoph: The role of formant positions and micro-modulations in blending and partial masking of musical instruments. In: Journal of the Acoustical Society of America (JASA), Vol. 126,4, 2009, p. 2237.
 Jenny, C., Reuter, C.: Usability of Individualized Head-Related Transfer Functions in Virtual Reality: Empirical Study With Perceptual Attributes in Sagittal Plane Sound Localization. JMIR Serious Games 2020;8(3):e17576, doi: 10.2196/17576.
 Bertsch, M., Reuter, C., Czedik-Eysenberg, I., Berger, A., Olischar, M., Bartha-Doering, L. and Giordano, V. (2020): The "Sound of Silence" in a Neonatal Intensive Care Unit-Listening to Speech and Music inside an Incubator. Frontiers in Psychology 11:1055. doi: 10.3389/fpsyg.2020.01055
 Starcke, K., von Georgi, R., Tiihonen, T. M., Laczika, K.-F., & Reuter, C. (2019): Don’t drink and chill: Effects of alcohol on subjective and physiological reactions during music listening and their relationships with personality and listening habits. International Journal of Psychophysiology, 142, 25–32. https://doi.org/10.1016/j.ijpsycho.2019.06.001
 Thiesen, F. C., Kopiez, R., Reuter, C., & Czedik-Eysenberg, I. (2019). A snippet in a snippet: Development of the Matryoshka principle for the construction of very short musical stimuli (plinks). Musicae Scientiae, 102986491882021. https://doi.org/10.1177/1029864918820212
 Reuter, C. (2018). Commentary on "An Exploratory Study of Western Orchestration: Patterns through History" by S.H. Chon, D. Huron, & D. DeVlieger. Empirical Musicology Review 12(3-4), 160-171. doi: dx.doi.org/10.18061/emr.v12i3-4.5992

Current list of publications

References

External links 
 
 Reuter on the Website of the University of Vienna

Academic staff of the University of Vienna
20th-century German musicologists
21st-century German musicologists
1968 births
Living people
People from Duisburg